Latin Bridge (Bosnian, Croatian and Serbian: Latinska ćuprija / Латинска ћуприја, named Principov most / Принципов мост – "Princip's Bridge" in Yugoslavian era) is an Ottoman bridge over the river Miljacka in Sarajevo, Bosnia and Herzegovina.  

The northern end of the bridge was the site of the assassination of Archduke Franz Ferdinand of Austria by Gavrilo Princip in 1914, which began the July Crisis that ultimately led to the outbreak of World War I.

History

The bridge received its name because it connected the right bank of the Miljacka with the Catholic quarter of the city, which was informally called "Latinluk" in Ottoman times. Judging by its foundations, it is the oldest among the preserved bridges in the city. The census of the Sanjak of Bosnia from 1541 mentions the bridge on this spot, built by the leather-worker Hussein, son of Sirmerd. This first bridge seems to have been made of wood, because the court record from 1565 witness that the stone bridge was built here by eminent citizen of Sarajevo Ali Ajni-Beg. 

A terrible flood on 15 November 1791 badly damaged the bridge and its reconstruction was financed by the Sarajevo merchant Abdulah-aga Briga. Someone worked out that the year when it was rebuilt can be obtained from the numerical values in the word 'Briga' – it is 1213, which by Islamic calendar equals the year of the reconstruction 1798/99.

The bridge has four arches and rests on three strong pillars and the embankment; it is built of stone and gypsum and the two relieving openings, 'eyes' in the mass above pillars are so characteristic that they can be seen in the seal of Sarajevo. Because of heavy traffic at the time of Austria-Hungary, the pavements on consoles were added to the bridge.

During the Yugoslav era, the bridge was known as Principov most / Принципов мост – "Princip's Bridge".

Assassination

On 28 June 1914, at the turning from the Right Bank into a street, Gavrilo Princip shot and killed Franz Ferdinand, heir presumptive to the  Austro-Hungarian throne. This was the immediate cause for the beginning of the First World War. The bridge was renamed Princip during the Yugoslavian era. The name returned to the Latin Bridge after the Yugoslav Wars.

Princip's testimony
At the judicial hearing on 12 October 1914, Princip described the site of the shooting during his interrogation, specifically mentioning the bridge.  The text reads:

See also
List of tourist attractions in Sarajevo

References

External links

Ottoman bridges in Bosnia and Herzegovina
Architecture in Bosnia and Herzegovina
Bridges in Sarajevo
Assassination of Archduke Franz Ferdinand of Austria
National Monuments of Bosnia and Herzegovina
Stone arch bridges
Medieval Bosnia and Herzegovina architecture
Assassination sites